Mirghani Alnasri (Arabic : ميرغني النصري) (born 1 July 1927 in Ruffa'a, Sudan) was a Sudanese politician for over 40 years. He started out as a lawyer in 1956, eventually becoming recognized as one of the Members of the Council of the State of Sudan.

Personal life

Mirghani Alnasri was born on 1 July 1927 in Ruffa'a, Sudan. 

In 1957, he married Maymouna Muhammed Taha, and they had eight children.

Education
Alnasri graduated with a diploma from Hantoub High School, which is known for its high-profile politician alumni. He graduated from Gordon Memorial College in 1955.

Political life

While in college, Alnasri was a member of the Islamic Socialist Party. 

He started his career as a lawyer in 1956. 

From 1973 to 1985 (with the exception of 1974 and 1976), he was elected the leader of the Sudanese Bar Association.

Publishing career

He is the author of a variety of political articles that were published in Al Rai Alaam Newspaper (Arabic: الرأي العام). He also published a book, Principles of constitutional law and the democratic experiment in Sudan (Arabic: مبادي القانون الدستوري والتجربة الديمقراطية في السودان), in 1998.

References

 https://news.google.com/newspapers?nid=1309&dat=19870824&id=UXtPAAAAIBAJ&sjid=YpADAAAAIBAJ&pg=6785,5255928
 https://www.hrw.org/reports/pdfs/s/sudan/sudan919.pdf
 Mabadi al-qanun al-dusturi wa-al-tajribah al-dimuqratiyah fi al-Sudan

1927 births
Living people
Sudanese politicians